Saladas Department is a  department of Corrientes Province in Argentina.

Settlements
Saladas
San Lorenzo

Departments of Corrientes Province